Decapitation is a military strategy aimed at removing the leadership or command and control of a hostile government or group. The strategy of shattering or defeating an enemy by eliminating its military and political leadership has long been utilized in warfare.

Genocide 
The deportation of Armenian intellectuals in 1915, considered the start of the Armenian genocide
German AB-Aktion in Poland by the Nazis during World War II
The Katyn massacre by the Soviet Union against Polish military officers. As Polish law required every university graduate to be a reserve officer, executing the officers among the Polish POWs allowed Lavrentiy Beria to stunt Polish science, culture and leadership.

In nuclear warfare 
In nuclear warfare theory, a decapitation strike is a pre-emptive first strike attack that aims to destabilize an opponent's military and civil leadership structure in the hope that it will severely degrade or destroy its capacity for nuclear retaliation. It is essentially a subset of a counterforce strike but whereas a counterforce strike seeks to destroy weapons directly, a decapitation strike is designed to remove an enemy's ability to use its weapons.

Strategies against decapitation strikes include the following:
 Distributed command and control structures.
 Dispersal of political leadership and military leadership in times of tension.
 Delegation of ICBM/SLBM launch capability to local commanders in the event of a decapitation strike.
 Distributed and diverse launch mechanisms.

A failed decapitation strike carries the risk of immediate, massive retaliation by the targeted opponent. Many countries with nuclear weapons specifically plan to prevent decapitation strikes by employing second-strike capabilities. Such countries may have mobile land-based launch, sea launch, air launch, and underground ballistic missile launch facilities so that a nuclear attack on one area of the country will not totally negate its ability to retaliate.

Other nuclear warfare doctrines explicitly exclude decapitation strikes on the basis that it is better to preserve the adversary's command and control structures so that a single authority remains that is capable of negotiating a surrender or ceasefire. Implementing fail-deadly mechanisms can be a way to deter decapitation strikes and respond to successful decapitation strikes.

Conventional warfare, assassination and terrorist acts 
Decapitation strikes have been employed in as a strategy in conventional warfare. The term has been used to describe the assassination of a government's entire leadership group or a nation's royal family.
Assassination attempts on Volodymyr Zelenskyy
The 2003 U.S. invasion of Iraq began with a decapitation strike against Saddam Hussein and other Iraqi military and political leaders. These air strikes failed to kill their intended targets.
The U.S. and its  NATO allies have, and continue to pursue this strategy in its efforts to dismantle militant Islamic fundamentalist networks, such as Al-Qaeda and ISIL, that threaten the United States and allies.
April 14, 1865: The assassination of U.S. President Abraham Lincoln by Confederate sympathizer John Wilkes Booth was part of a larger plot to disrupt the presidential line of succession by also killing then-Vice President Andrew Johnson, and Secretary of State William H. Seward, at the close of the American Civil War
February 1, 1908: King Carlos I of Portugal was assassinated along with his son the Crown Prince Luís Filipe by Alfredo Luís da Costa and Manuel Buiça, both connected to the Carbonária (the Portuguese section of the Carbonari)
July 17, 1918: Tsar Nicholas II of Russia and the Imperial Family were executed by a Bolshevik firing squad under the command of Yakov Yurovsky
November 9, 1939: Attempt on German Führer Adolf Hitler's life in the Burgerbräukeller in Munich by Swabian carpenter Georg Elser, using a time bomb in order to cripple the Third Reich and its war effort. Several died, but Hitler escaped due to a change in schedule, leaving the rostrum 13 minutes before impact.
July 20, 1944: Claus von Stauffenberg attempted to assassinate Hitler and his inner circle of advisers by a suitcase bomb as part of a broader military coup d'état against the Nazi government, which ultimately failed.
Yemen 1948 Alwaziri coup.

In recent warfare, unmanned aerial vehicles, or drones, are popularly used for decapitation strikes against terrorist and insurgent groups. Drones are most effective in areas with inadequate air defense. There are mixed scholarly opinions whether or not decapitation strikes via drones effectively degrade the capabilities of these groups.

Some military strategists, like General Michael Flynn, have argued that the experience gained by the American and Coalition military experience from fighting the Taliban insurgency in Afghanistan was in support of kill or capture operations, but that they would be ineffective without a full understanding of how they would affect the local political landscape in the country.

Robert Pape has argued that decapitation is a relatively ineffective strategy. He writes that decapitation is a seductive strategy as it promises "to solve conflicts quickly and cheaply with... little collateral damage, and minimal or no friendly casualties", but decapitation strikes frequently fail or are not likely to produce the intended consequences even if successful.

Counterterrorism theorists Max Abrahms and Jochen Mierau argue that leadership decapitation in a terrorist or rebel group has the tendency to create disorder within the group, but  find decapitation ineffective because group disorder can often lead to politically ineffective, unfocused attacks on civilians. The two conclude that "[t]his change in the internal composition of militant groups may affect the quality and hence selectivity of their violence."  

One tactic that is sometimes used to inform the target selection for decapitation strikes is social network analysis. This tactic involves identifying and eliminating higher ranked members in a hierarchically arranged rebel or terrorist group by targeting lower members first, and using intel gained in initial strikes to identify an organization's leadership. Some strategists, like Generals David Petraeus and Stanley McChrystal, have also called for dedicated task units that are non-hierarchical and can be reorganized, in order to face similar distributed or decentralized terrorist groups.  Others, however, argue that decapitation strikes combined with social network analysis are more than unproductive, but can prolong a conflict due to their habit of eliminating rebel or terrorist leaders who are the most capable peace negotiators or have the potential to advance communities hardest hit by terror campaigns after the cessation of hostilities.

See also 
 Continuity of government
 Designated survivor
 Preemptive war
 Preventive war
 Samson Option
 Targeted killing
 List of military strategies and concepts
 List of military tactics
 Operation Looking Glass

References

Assassinations
Military strategy
Continuity of government
Military leadership